The following is a list of episodes for the animated television series Viva Piñata.

Overview
Viva Piñata premiered on August 26, 2006 on 4Kids TV. It is a co-production between 4Kids Entertainment and YTV Original Production, and is animated by Bardel Entertainment. It aired in more than 107 different countries and was translated into 27 languages.

As of January 18, 2009, 40 episodes have aired on the United States and 52 episodes have aired in Canada.
The first 20 episodes of Season 1 were aired from August 26, 2006 to April 28, 2007, while the last 6 episodes were held over until the fall season, beginning September 8, 2007. The first 8 episodes of Season 2 were then aired following them, until December 8, 2007. The remaining 18 episodes of Season 2 aired on the Canadian television network YTV, and aired on The CW4Kids beginning September 13, 2008, but then was removed from the block on October 18, 2008 after airing six episodes.
Each season consists of 26 episodes, while each episode consists of two eleven-minute segments.

Series overview

Episodes
Unless otherwise noted, the original airdates refer to the episodes' premieres on 4Kids TV.

Season 1 (2006–07)

Season 2 (2007–09)

DVD releases

Region 1 (United States/Canada)

The DVDs are distributed through Shout Factory.

Region 2 (United Kingdom/Castleford) 

The DVDs are distributed through Walt Disney Pictures. Volume 3 is the Last Volume because the Last episode is Candibalism which has Fergy Catapulted To the Moon, where he finds candy at the ending of the episode.

Region 4 (Australia/New Zealand)

DVDs in these regions were released by magna pacific
As of January 2009, 3 volumes had been released with a 4th due in March, However magna pacific followed their usual habit of releasing kids TV shows and stopping after a few releases (Megaman) thus, at this stage no more are being released.

Region 3 (New Zealand) 

The DVDs are distributed through Warner Bros.

References

External links
4Kids.tv episode listing page
YTV Viva Piñata episode listing page
Viva Pinata wiki - PinataIsland.info

Viva Piñata
Viva Pinata episodes
Viva Pinata episodes